An erg is a unit of energy.

Erg, Ergs or ERG may also refer to:

Arts and entertainment
 Mikey Erg (born 1980), American musician
 Erg (comics), a fictional character in the Marvel Comics Universe
 Erg (Hyperion), a creature in the Hyperion Cantos series by Dan Simmons

Organisations
 Education Reference Group, in Connecticut, US
 Eurasian Resources Group, a Luxembourgish mining and smelting company
 European Research Group, anti-EU group of British Conservative MPs
 Edoardo Raffinerie Garrone, an Italian energy company
 Efficiency and Reform Group, of the Cabinet Office of the UK
 Videlli, an Australian smart card ticketing system manufacturer formerly known as ERG Group

Places
 English Riviera Geopark, in Torbay, England
 Erbogachen Airport (IATA code), Russia

Science and technology
 Electron-releasing group
 Electroretinography, or electroretinogram
 Erg (landform), sand dune field
 ERG (gene)
 ERG theory, in psychology
 Exploration of Energization and Radiation in Geospace, now Arase, a Japanese scientific satellite

Other uses
 Employee resource group, groups of employees who join together in their workplace
 Emergency Response Guidebook, a hazardous-materials reference book
 Erg (indoor rower)
 Erg (tug), a Canadian tug, sunk in Halifax Harbour in 1943
 Ergative case